Schizopus is a genus of beetles in the family Schizopodidae, containing the following species:

 Schizopus laetus LeConte, 1858
 Schizopus sallei Horn, 1885

References

Schizopodidae
Buprestoidea genera